Young-hu Kim is a South Korean music producer, songwriter and software engineer.  He works mainly with SM Entertainment artists, and has written songs for Girls Generation, Exo, TVXQ, BoA, Shinee, f(x), Super Junior, Shinhwa, and Fly to the Sky.

Career
Born on November 7, 1981, in Seoul, South Korea, Young-hu Kim started his career when he was signed to SM Entertainment as the youngest producer at the age of 15.  His first number 1 single was Shinhwa's "I Pray For You", with work on subsequent hits including TVXQ's "Whatever They Say," Shinee's "Replay," and Girls Generation's "Oh." He co-founded XP Music Publishing based in Los Angeles, with offices in Seoul and Tokyo, taking on projects in tech and building the first online music publishing catalog system in South Korea. 
He is currently the CEO of the technology company Qoop.

Discography

South Korea
BoA: My Prayer - 250,000 copies sold (2 platinum) 
BoA: If You Were Here - 120,000 copies sold (platinum)
BoA: Girls on Top(English Version) 
Exo: My Turn to Cry - 500,000 copies sold
Exo: Can't Bring Me Down - 1 Million copies sold
Fly to the Sky:  How Many Nights, How Many Days - 200,000 copies sold (2 platinum)
Fly to the Sky:  Magic Song - 170,000 copies sold (platinum) - Number 3 on biggest online chart
Fly to the Sky: My Never ending Story - 100,000 copies sold (platinum) 
F(x): Me + U - 100,000 copies sold (platinum)
F(x): Goodbye Summer - 80,000 copies sold
F(x): Summer Lover
F(x): Diamond
Girl's Generation: Let's Talk About Love - 100,000 copies sold(platinum)
Girl's Girls Generation: Oh! - 300,000 copies sold (3 platinum) - number 1 on several countries. Number 1 on numerous music channels.  Winner of Golden Disc Award 
Girl's Generation: Say Yes - 400,000 copies sold (4 platinum) - won Golden Disk Awards and Seoul Music Awards 
Isak N Jiyeon: I Dream Of You
S.E.S.: You Told Me
Shinee:  Replay
Shinee: Love Like Oxygen
Shinee: In my room - 150,000 copies sold(platinum) 
Shinee:  차라리 때려 - 150,000 copies sold (platinum)
Shinee: Y.O.U. (Year Of Us) 
Shinee: Runaway - 250,000 copies sold (2 platinum) 
Shinhwa:  Just 2 be with U - 400,000 copies sold (4 platinum)
Shinhwa: I pray 4 U - 400,000 copies sold (4 platinum) - Number 1 song on MBC Music Show, SBS Music Show and several online charts. Japanese Anime “Inuyasha” Korea Territory title song
Shinhwa: Soulmate - 300,000 copies sold (3 platinum)
Shinhwa: Hurricane - 100,000 copies sold (platinum)
Super Junior: Over - 100,000 copies sold (platinum)
Super Junior: You're my endless love - 200,000 copies sold (2 platinum)
Super Junior: She wants it - 300,000 copies sold (3 platinum)
Super Junior: Shake It Up! - 300,000 copies sold (3 platinum)
Super Junior: Over - 100,000 copies sold (platinum)
The Grace: Dancer In The Rain
The Grace: Catch The Shooting Star
Tim: Sarang Han Mankeum 
Tim: My Destiny
Tim: Nae Ahn Eh Jun Jeng
Tim: Manual For My Heart
TVXQ: Whatever They Say - 300,000 copies sold (3 platinum) - Number 4 on SBS music show. 
TVXQ: Free your mind
TVXQ: Beautiful Life - 300,000 copies sold (3 platinum)
TVXQ: 세상의단하나뿐인마음
TVXQ: On & On - 535,000 copies sold (5 platinum) - Number 1 album of 2006 + Winner of Golden Disc Award.
TVXQ: Crazy Love
TVXQ:  넌 나의 노래 - 600,000 copies sold (6 platinum) - Number 1 album of 2008, Winner of Golden Disc Award.
TVXQ:  Here I stand - 300,000 copies sold (3 platinum)
Whee Sung: Angel - 400,000 copies sold (4 platinum)

Japan
Girls Generation Oh! single: Oh! - 100,000 copies sold (gold) - Number One on Oricon Chart
Girls Generation 2nd album: Oh! - 200,000 copies sold (gold)
Shinee 1st single album: Replay - 110,000 copies sold (gold)
Shinee 1st album: Replay - 120,000 copies sold (gold)
Tenjochiki Piranha album: Just for one day - 100,000 copies sold (gold)
TVXQ 3rd album: Beautiful Life -150,000 copies sold (gold)
TVXQ 3rd Album: You're my miracle - 150,000 copies sold (gold)
TVXQ Bolero album: Wasurenaide - 150,000 copies sold (gold)
TVXQ 4th album: Wasurenaide - 300,000 copies sold (platinum)

References

SM Entertainment people
South Korean electronic musicians
South Korean dance musicians
South Korean songwriters
South Korean record producers
1981 births
Living people